Arthur Alexander Johann Milchhöfer (21 March 1852 – 7 December 1903) was a German archaeologist born in Schirwindt, East Prussia, a village in the easternmost corner of the German Reich. He specialized in studies of Greek Antiquity, and is remembered for his topographical research of ancient Attica.  
 
He studied in Berlin and at the University of Munich, where he was a student of Heinrich Brunn (1822–1894). Subsequently, he became an assistant to Ernst Curtius (1814–1896) in Berlin, and in 1883 was habilitated for archaeology at the University of Göttingen. Later on, he was an associate professor at the University of Münster, where he was also in charge of the library of classical archaeology. In 1895, he became a professor of archaeology at the University of Kiel.

Published works 
In his 1883 book "Die Anfänge der Kunst in Griechenland" (The Origins of Art in Greece), he was the first to suggest that Crete was the center of Mycenaean culture. Other noted works on ancient Greece by Milchhöfer include:
 Die Stadtgeschichte von Athen (The history of the city of Athens), (1891); with Ernst Curtius (1814–1896).
 Karten von Attika (Charts of Attica), (1881–1903); with Curtius and Johann August Kaupert (1822–1899).

References

Further reading 
 Ostdeutsche-Biographie (biography translated from German)
 History Today Arthur Evans begins to dig in Crete

Works cited
 

1852 births
1903 deaths

German archaeologists
People from the Province of Prussia
Academic staff of the University of Kiel
Academic staff of the University of Münster